Gabriel Gilbert Daim (born 9 October 2001) is a Malaysian diver.  He competes in 1m springboard, 3m springboard, mixed synchronized diving 3m and synchronized diving 3m.

Career 
In 2017, Daim teamed up with Nur Dhabitah Sabri to bagged a silver in 3m mixed synchronized diving platform in Kuala Lumpur, Malaysia. It was his first medal in the Fina Diving Grand Prix. After that, he and Nur Dhabitah Sabri managed to advance to the final again and won his second silver medal in 3m mixed synchronized diving platform in Gold Coast. Australia. Not only that, he also won his first gold medal at 2017 Southeast Asian Games in team event.

In 2018, Daim made his first debut in Commonwealth Games . He finished 7th in the Men's synchronised 3 metre springboard with Muhammad Syafiq Puteh. In the same year, Daim competed in the World Diving Championships but had to accept the defeat after placing 6th in the Men's Synchronized diving 3m with his partner Muhammad Syafiq Puteh.

In 2019, he won his first title in Fina Diving Grand Prix after collecting 363.30 points in the Men's Synchronized diving 3m event with his partner Muhammad Syafiq Puteh.

In 2021, he brought a silver medal for Malaysia in the Men's 3m spring board at the 2021 Southeast Asian Games.

In 2022, Daim and Muhammad Syafiq Puteh have surprised the nation after winning a silver medal in the 3m synchronized springboard event at the 2022 Commonwealth Games.

External links

References 

Living people
Malaysian male divers
Commonwealth Games medallists in diving
Divers at the 2018 Commonwealth Games
Divers at the 2022 Commonwealth Games
Southeast Asian Games gold medalists for Malaysia
Southeast Asian Games medalists in diving
Competitors at the 2017 Southeast Asian Games
Competitors at the 2019 Southeast Asian Games
Competitors at the 2021 Southeast Asian Games
2001 births
Commonwealth Games silver medallists for Malaysia
21st-century Malaysian people
Medallists at the 2022 Commonwealth Games